Sid Williams (born 1942) is a former American football linebacker.

Sid, Syd, Sidney or Sydney Williams may also refer to:

 Sidney Williams (born 1962), American author 
 Sid E. Williams (1928–2012), American chiropractor and founder of Life University
 Sid Williams (footballer) (1919–2003), English association footballer for Bristol City from 1937 to 1952
 Sid Williams (rugby league), Australian rugby footballer who played in the 1960s and 1979s
 Syd Williams (1918–1976), Welsh rugby union and rugby league footballer
 Sid Williams Theatre is the major performance theatre in the Comox Valley, Courtenay, British Columbia, Canada

See also
 Sid Williams Richardson
 Sidney Williamson